Haldane's dilemma, also known as "the waiting time problem", is a limit on the speed of beneficial evolution, calculated by J. B. S. Haldane in 1957. Before the invention of DNA sequencing technologies, it was not known how much polymorphism DNA harbored, although alloenzymes (variant forms of an enzyme which differ structurally but not functionally from other alloenzymes coded for by different alleles at the same locus) were beginning to make it clear that substantial polymorphism existed. This was puzzling because the amount of polymorphism known to exist seemed to exceed the theoretical limits that Haldane calculated, that is, the limits imposed if polymorphisms present in the population generally influence an organism's fitness. Motoo Kimura's landmark paper on neutral theory in 1968 built on Haldane's work to suggest that most molecular evolution is neutral, resolving the dilemma. Although neutral evolution remains the consensus theory among modern biologists, and thus Kimura's resolution of Haldane's dilemma is widely regarded as correct, some biologists argue that adaptive evolution explains a large fraction of substitutions in protein coding sequence, and they propose alternative solutions to Haldane's dilemma.

Substitution cost 

In the introduction to The Cost of Natural Selection Haldane writes that it is difficult for breeders to simultaneously select all the desired qualities, partly because the required genes may not be found together in the stock; but, he writes,

especially in slowly breeding animals such as cattle, one cannot cull even half the females, even though only one in a hundred of them combines the various qualities desired.

That is, the problem for the cattle breeder is that keeping only the specimens with the desired qualities will lower the reproductive capability too much to keep a useful breeding stock.

Haldane states that this same problem arises with respect to natural selection. Characters that are positively correlated at one time may be negatively correlated at a later time, so simultaneous optimization of more than one character is a problem also in nature. And, as Haldane writes

[i]n this paper I shall try to make quantitative the fairly obvious statement that natural selection cannot occur with great intensity for a number of characters at once unless they happen to be controlled by the same genes.

In faster breeding species there is less of a problem. Haldane mentions the peppered moth, Biston betularia, whose variation in pigmentation is determined by several alleles at a single gene. One of these alleles, "C", is dominant to all the others, and any CC or  Cx moths are dark (where "x" is any other allele). Another allele, "c", is recessive to all the others, and cc moths are light. Against the originally pale lichens the darker moths were easier for birds to pick out, but in areas, where pollution has darkened the lichens, the cc moths had become rare. Haldane mentions that in a single day the frequency of cc moths might be halved.

Another potential problem is that if "ten other independently inherited characters had been subject to selection of the same intensity as that for colour, only , or one in 1024, of the original genotype would have survived." The species would most likely have become extinct; but it might well survive ten other selective periods of comparable selectivity, if they happened in different centuries.

Selection intensity 

The proportion for the entire population that die without reproducing is thus , and this would have been  if all genotypes had survived as well as the optimal. Hence  is the proportion of "genetic" deaths due to selection. As Haldane mentions, if , then .

The cost 

Haldane writes

I shall investigate the following case mathematically. A population is in equilibrium under selection and mutation. One or more genes are rare because their appearance by mutation is balanced by natural selection. A sudden change occurs in the environment, for example, pollution by smoke, a change of climate, the introduction of a new food source, predator, or pathogen, and above all migration to a new habitat. It will be shown later that the general conclusions are not affected if the change is slow. The species is less adapted to the new environment, and its reproductive capacity is lowered. It is gradually improved as a result of natural selection. But meanwhile, a number of deaths, or their equivalents in lowered fertility, have occurred.

The problem statement is therefore that the alleles in question are not particularly beneficial under the previous circumstances; but a change in environment favors these genes by natural selection. The individuals without the genes are therefore disfavored, and the favorable genes spread in the population by the death (or lowered fertility) of the individuals without the genes. Note that Haldane's model as stated here allows for more than one gene to move towards fixation at a time; but each such will add to the cost of substitution.

A mathematical model of the cost of diploids 
Their relative fitness is given by

where 0 ≤  ≤ 1, and 0 ≤ λ ≤ 1.

If λ = 0, then Aa has the same fitness as AA, e.g. if Aa is phenotypically equivalent with AA (A dominant), and if λ = 1, then Aa has the same fitness as aa, e.g. if Aa is phenotypically equivalent with aa (A recessive). In general λ indicates how close in fitness Aa is to aa.

The fraction of selective deaths in the  generation then is

 

and the total number of deaths is the population size multiplied by

Important number 300 
Haldane approximates the above equation by taking the continuum limit of the above equation. This is done by multiplying and dividing it by dq so that it is in integral form

substituting q=1-p, the cost (given by the total number of deaths, 'D', required to make a substitution) is given by

 

Assuming λ < 1, this gives

 

where the last approximation assumes  to be small.

If λ = 1, then we have

 

In his discussion Haldane writes that the substitution cost, if it is paid by juvenile deaths, "usually involves a number of deaths equal to about 10 or 20 times the number in a generation" – the minimum being the population size (= "the number in a generation") and rarely being 100 times that number. Haldane assumes 30 to be the mean value.

Assuming substitution of genes to take place slowly, one gene at a time over n generations, the fitness of the species will fall below the optimum (achieved when the substitution is complete) by a factor of about 30/n, so long as this is small – small enough to prevent extinction. Haldane doubts that high intensities – such as in the case of the peppered moth – have occurred frequently and estimates that a value of n = 300 is a probable number of generations.

Haldane then continues:

The number of loci in a vertebrate species has been estimated at about 40,000. 'Good' species, even when closely related, may differ at several thousand loci, even if the differences at most of them are very slight. But it takes as many deaths, or their equivalents, to replace a gene by one producing a barely distinguishable phenotype as by one producing a very different one. If two species differ at 1000 loci, and the mean rate of gene substitution, as has been suggested, is one per 300 generations, it will take 300,000 generations to generate an interspecific difference. It may take a good deal more, for if an allele a1 is replaced by a10, the population may pass through stages where the commonest genotype is a1a1, a2a2, a3a3, and so on, successively, the various alleles in turn giving maximal fitness in the existing environment and the residual environment.

The number 300 of generations is a conservative estimate for a slowly evolving species not at the brink of extinction by Haldane's calculation. For a difference of at least 1,000 genes, 300,000 generations might be needed – maybe more, if some gene runs through more than one optimisation.

Origin of the term "Haldane's dilemma" 
Apparently the first use of the term "Haldane's dilemma" was by paleontologist Leigh Van Valen in his 1963 paper "Haldane's Dilemma, Evolutionary Rates, and Heterosis".

Van Valen writes:

Haldane (1957 [= The Cost of Natural Selection]) drew attention to the fact that in the process of the evolutionary substitution of one allele for another, at any intensity of selection and no matter how slight the importance of the locus, a substantial number of individuals would usually be lost because they did not already possess the new allele. Kimura (1960, 1961) has referred to this loss as the substitutional (or evolutional) load, but because it necessarily involves either a completely new mutation or (more usually) previous change in the environment or the genome, I like to think of it as a dilemma for the population: for most organisms, rapid turnover in a few genes precludes rapid turnover in the others. A corollary of this is that, if an environmental change occurs that necessitates the rather rapid replacement of several genes if a population is to survive, the population becomes extinct.

That is, since a high number of deaths are required to fix one gene rapidly, and dead organisms do not reproduce, fixation of more than one gene simultaneously would conflict. Note that Haldane's model assumes independence of genes at different loci; if the selection intensity is 0.1 for each gene moving towards fixation, and there are N such genes, then the reproductive capacity of the species will be lowered to 0.9N times the original capacity. Therefore, if it is necessary for the population to fix more than one gene, it may not have reproductive capacity to counter the deaths.

Evolution above Haldane's limit 

Various models evolve at rates above Haldane's limit.

J. A. Sved showed that a threshold model of selection, where individuals with a phenotype less than the threshold die and individuals with a phenotype above the threshold are all equally fit, allows for a greater substitution rate than Haldane's model (though no obvious upper limit was found, though tentative paths to calculate one were examined e.g. the death rate). John Maynard Smith  and Peter O'Donald followed on the same track.

Additionally, the effects of density-dependent processes, epistasis, and soft selective sweeps on the maximum rate of substitution have been examined.

By looking at the polymorphisms within species and divergence between species an estimate can be obtained for the fraction of substitutions that occur due to selection. This parameter is generally called alpha (hence DFE-alpha), and appears to be large in some species, although almost all approaches suggest that the human-chimp divergence was primarily neutral. However, if divergence between Drosophila species was as adaptive as the alpha parameter suggests, then it would exceed Haldane's limit.

See also 
 Error catastrophe
 Genetic drift
 Genetic load
 Muller's ratchet

References

Further reading

 
  (This paper describes computer simulations of small populations with variations in mutation rate and other factors, and produces results that are dramatically different from Haldane's low substitution limit except in certain limited situations).

Population genetics
Evolutionary biology
Mathematical and theoretical biology
Works by J. B. S. Haldane
Dilemmas

it:Disegno intelligente#Dilemma di Haldane